Darren Hossack (born 1 April 1970) is a multiple-championship winning Australian race car driver.

Early career
A long time kart racing driver, working professionally in the industry for Drew Price Engineering, he stepped into circuit racing in 1992 in state level Formula Ford, and won the Victorian championship in his debut season, a first title for emerging Formula Ford constructor, Spectrum. Without the funding to progress his career stalled at this point, taking him back to kart racing, picking up the Australian Reed Light Championship in 1994, and also into dirt-track Speedway, running Super Sedans.

Touring Cars
An opportunity opened in 1997 for Hossack, driving the Wynns backed Holden Commodore in the 1997 Australian Touring Car Championship, and impressed in the midfield, snatching several top ten results during the season. For the final round he moved into a Gibson Motor Sport run Commodore, which continued into the endurance season where on his Bathurst debut, he and co-driver Steven Ellery finished in sixth position, the highest placed finish for any rookie in the race.

1998 saw a full-time drive in the Gibson Motor Sport team along with Wynns backed team mate Darren Pate, and Ellery also as team mate in a Holden Young Lions liviered Commodore. Hampered by Yokohama tyres, which were no match for Bridgestone and Dunlop shod teams, it was not a happy season and Hossack was replaced after the Barbagallo Raceway round by experienced veteran Tomas Mezera as the team struggled for pace. Hossack returned to the team for the endurance races and paired with Pate, took eighth place at the Sandown 500 and seventh at Bathurst.

While a full-time V8 Supercar drive did not return, Hossack was a valued endurance co-driver for the next several seasons, driving for Romano Racing in 1999 and returning to Gibson Motor Sport in 2000 with a highlight of ninth position for GMS with David 'Truckie' Parsons at Bathurst in 2000. After a few seasons away from V8 Supercars, Hossack returned in 2003, driving a third Ford Performance Racing Falcon with Adam Macrow.

Australian Champion
 Hossack became involved in John Gourlay's Sports Sedan team, driving a Chevrolet V8 powered Saab 900. He finished runner up to Tony Ricciardello in the 2002 Australian Sports Sedan Championship, and fourth in 2003 behind Kerry Baily, Dean Randle and Ricciardello, before claiming a hard fought win in the 2004 Tranzam Sports Sedan Series. After placing third in the 2005 series the team scaled down their efforts over the next few years having come to the end of the Saab's racing career (it was sold during the 2006 season to Mark Nelson) and construction began on a new race car. Again Chevrolet V8 powered, the Audi A4 made its debut in 2007, and quickly became a race winning car. In an epic finale to the 2008 season, with the pointscore tied heading into the final race Hossack beat 2007 series winner Ricciardello to win the race and the series by three points.

The 2007 season saw Hossack begin racing Superkarts as well, racing the Anderson Maverick owned by Scott Ellis' Safe Evolutions team, which Ellis was using to prove his own engine design, the Safe Racing Engine, which was a modern re-interpretation of the 20-year-old Rotax 256 design. Promising results in the first season lead to his first race wins, first at state level in Victoria, then in front of a national field on the support program of the 2008 Eastern Creek round of the V8 Supercar Championship.

Two race wins at the opening round of the Australian Superkart Championship also held at Eastern Creek Raceway set up a points buffer which was whittled away as the final round at Mallala Motor Sport Park progressed. With a slender points lead to protect, and title rivals Sam Zavaglia and Gary Pegoraro winning races almost lost the title. After almost stalling on the final race, Hossack raced back through the field, overtaking 25 karts over the eight lap finale to climb into third place on the final lap. With Zavaglia finishing second, it gave the title to Hossack by just three points.

Hossack lost both titles in 2009, his rivalry with Tony Ricciardello saw category veteran Des Wall win the Sports Sedan series with a consistent run, and Sam Zavaglia took the Superkart title with a career best season. Hossack was third in Sports Sedans and second in Superkarts. 2010 saw a return to the title claiming his second Australian Championship in Superkarts after win in the final race of the series broke a tie with Warren McIlveen whose previously points leading Superkart limped to the line in third position.

Career results

References 

1970 births
Australian racing drivers
Living people
Supercars Championship drivers
Australian Touring Car Championship drivers